Gamester or The Gamester may refer to:

 Russ Gamester (born 1965), American auto racing driver
 The Gamester, a 1633 play by James Shirley
 The Gamester (Centlivre play), a 1705 play by Susanna Centlivre
 The Gamesters, a 1920 American silent film
 The Gamester (novel), a 1949 novel by Rafael Sabatini

See also
 The Compleat Gamester, a 1674 English-language games compendia